Varni is a town in Nizamabad district in the Indian state of Telangana. Varni Mandal Headquarters is Varni.

Geography
It has an average elevation of 403 metres. It comes under Banswada Legislative and Zaheerabad Parliamentary constituencies. There is a statue of Netaji Shubash Chandra Bose in center of the town, popularly known as center/Bose bomma.

Economy
The villages under this mandal live mainly on agriculture and animal husbandry. Nizamsagar Project Canal is the main source of irrigation, though many bore-wells are used in recent times. Milk production is high in this area.

Demography
According to Indian census, 2011, the demographic details of Varni mandal are as follows:
 Total Population: 	1,72,230	 
 Male Population: 	85,311	and Female Population: 	86,919
 Total Literates: 	1,36,402

References

Cities and towns in Nizamabad district